Alfred Ian Watt  was an Anglican priest in the second half of the 20th century.

He was born in 1934, trained at Edinburgh Theological College and was ordained in 1960. Initially a curate at St Paul's Cathedral, Dundee, he was then Rector of Arbroath  before becoming Provost of St Ninian's Cathedral, Perth in 1969. After 13 years in post  he became Rector of St Paul's Kinross before his appointment as Dean of  St Andrews, Dunkeld and Dunblane. He retired in 1998.

References

1934 births
Provosts of St Ninian's Cathedral, Perth
Deans of St Andrews, Dunkeld and Dunblane
Living people